Pontius Pilate is an Italian drama film from 1962, directed by Gian Paolo Callegari and Irving Rapper, written by Oreste Biancoli, starring Jean Marais and Jeanne Crain.

The film is known under the titles: Ponce Pilate (France), Poncio Pilatos (Spain), Pontius Pilate (UK / US), Pontius Pilatus – Statthalter des Grauens (Germany).

John Drew Barrymore plays the characters of both Judas Iscariot and Jesus of Nazareth.

The scenario is based mainly on the Gospel of John. The following biblical passages are quoted in the film: Matthew 27:11; Mark 15:2; Luke 23:1; John 18:33; 18:37; John 18:38; 19:9-11; Matthew 27:24; Deuteronomy 21:6-7; John 19:19-21; 19:22.

This film takes a perspective on events surrounding the Passion of Jesus Christ by focusing on Pontius Pilate, the Procurator of Judea who condemned Him to death. Pilate is a man for whom nothing seems to go as planned.

The film was produced in Italy and released there on 15 February 1962.

Cast 
 Jean Marais : Pontius Pilate
 Jeanne Crain : Claudia Procula
 Basil Rathbone : Caiaphas
 Letícia Román : Sarah
 John Drew Barrymore : Judas, Jesus
 Massimo Serato : Nicodemus
 Riccardo Garrone : Galba
 Livio Lorenzon : Barabbas
 Gianni Garko : Jonathan
 Roger Tréville : Aaron El Mesin
 Carlo Giustini : Decio
 Dante DiPaolo : Simone
 Paul Muller : Mehlik
 Alfredo Varelli : Joseph of Arimathea
 Manuela Ballard : Ester (as Manoela Ballard)
 Raffaella Carrà : Jessica

References

External links 

 
 Ponzio Pilato (1962) at the Films de France
 Ponzio Pilato (1962) at the World Cinema

1962 films
1962 drama films
Italian drama films
French drama films
Peplum films
CinemaScope films
1960s Italian-language films
1960s French-language films
1960s English-language films
Films directed by Irving Rapper
Films based on the New Testament
Religious epic films
Cultural depictions of Judas Iscariot
Cultural depictions of Pontius Pilate
Films scored by Angelo Francesco Lavagnino
English-language French films
English-language Italian films
Sword and sandal films
Portrayals of Jesus in film
Works set in the 30s
1960s multilingual films
Italian multilingual films
French multilingual films
1960s Italian films
1960s French films